Grey Island may refer to:

Grey Island (South Orkney Islands) 
Grey Island (Western Australia)